Predrag Materić (born 12 June 1977) is a Serbian–French sports agent and former professional basketball player who serves as a vice-president at BeoBasket.

Playing career 
Materić played college basketball for the UConn Huskies, Barton Cougars, and UAB Blazers.

A swingman, Materić spent his professional career with Olimpia Milano, BCM Gravelines, S.S. Felice Scandone, Dinamo Sassari, Gymnastikos S. Larissas 1928, Le Havre, Partizan, Hemofarm, P.A.O.K., CSU Asesoft Ploiești, and Mega Ishrana. He retired as a professional player with Mega Ishrana in 2006.

Career achievements
 FIBA EuroCup Challenge champion: 1  (with CSU Asesoft Ploiești: 2004–05)
 YUBA League champion: 2 (with Partizan: 2001–02, 2003–04)
 Yugoslav Cup winner: 1  (with Partizan: 2001–02)

Basketball agent career 
Materić serves as a Vice President and director of French basketball at the BeoBasket agency.

See also 
 Serbs in France
 Serbs in Sarajevo

References

External links
 Predrag Materic at hoopsagents.com
 Predrag Materic at eurobasket.com
 Predrag Materic at proballers.com
 Predrag Materic at basketball-reference.com
 Predrag Materic at realgm.com
 Predrag Materic at sports-reference.com
 Predrag Materic at legabasket.it

1977 births
Living people
Basketball players from Belgrade
Barton Cougars men's basketball players
BCM Gravelines players
Dinamo Sassari players
CSU Asesoft Ploiești players
French expatriate basketball people in Greece
French expatriate basketball people in Italy
French expatriate basketball people in Serbia
French expatriate basketball people in the United States
French men's basketball players
French people of Bosnia and Herzegovina descent
French people of Serbian descent
French sports agents
KK Hemofarm players
KK Mega Basket players
KK Partizan players
Naturalized citizens of France
Olimpia Milano players
P.A.O.K. BC players
S.S. Felice Scandone players
STB Le Havre players
Serbian expatriate basketball people in France
Serbian expatriate basketball people in Greece
Serbian expatriate basketball people in Italy
Serbian expatriate basketball people in Romania
Serbian expatriate basketball people in the United States
Serbian sports agents
Serbian men's basketball players
Serbs of Bosnia and Herzegovina
UAB Blazers men's basketball players
UConn Huskies men's basketball players
Yugoslav men's basketball players
Yugoslav Wars refugees